The Williamsport Dam, officially known as the Hepburn Street Dam,  is a low-head dam on the West Branch Susquehanna River in Williamsport, Pennsylvania. It broke ground in 1984 and was finished in the spring of 1986. It was built for recreation, such as boating, watersports and fishing. It has been described as a "killer dam" and a "drowning machine".

Background

The old Hepburn Street Dam (pre-1984) was made of wooden timber cribs filled with rock with a 4-inch thick wooden apron on the downstream side. The new dam, constructed in 1984–1986, was built for recreation. Before the dam was built, the average depth of the West Branch Susquehanna River was 4.6 feet, with its deepest parts being just under 10 feet deep. Some places were impassable by boat, being only a couple of feet or a few inches deep. Since the construction of the new dam, the average depth of the West Branch Susquehanna is 8.3 feet, with some depths of over 20 feet.

Low head dams like this one are known as "drowning machines" or "killer dams" due to their aggressive churning nature. Recirculating currents below the dam will easily trap and down a person. At least 30 confirmed deaths have occurred at a similar low-head dam on the same waterway about 90 miles downstream in Harrisburg.

On Tuesday April 9, 1991, 28 year old Jeffrey Wayne Biechy, was pulled into the dam and killed after his boat sank upstream. Lycoming County Coroner George Gedon ruled Biechy died of asphyxiation from drowning.

On Friday July 30, 2016, 55 year old Williamsport native Crist Stouffer of 424 W. Fourth St. jumped from the fish ladder on the south side of the river. He was swept into the dam and then downstream. After being rescued by South Williamsport Police, CPR was performed and he was transported to the Williamsport Hospital before being transferred to Geisinger Medical Center in Danville. He was pronounced dead early Monday morning from multiple blunt force trauma injuries.

In May 2019, fisherman made the gruesome discovery just below the Hepburn Street Dam. Two severed human legs were discovered on the north shore of the river in Williamsport. After an investigation, it was determined the legs belonged to a Brenda Jacobs who was murdered in Montoursville in 2003. Her body was discovered 4 months later in a storage locker in Philadelphia. The murderer, Jade Babock, told investigators he killed Jacobs on December 26, 2003, in Montoursville and took the remains with him when he moved to Philadelphia in April 2019.

In March 2021, the body of 17 year old Maverick Wilton was pulled from the Susquehanna River near the Shady Nook Boat Launch nearly 40 miles down stream from Williamsport. It is believed he may have gone through the dam, but this cannot be confirmed. He was missing for nearly four months before being found in Snyder County. His body was identified through dental records.

Hydroelectric proposal 
Ever since the dam was rebuilt and updated Williamsport and county officials expressed interest in converting the low-head dam into a hydroelectric dam. Multiple companies have expressed interest in converting the dam in the past, however none have released a feasible plan to generate electricity there.

In 2016, a privately held hydropower development company that has projects in more than a dozen states believes its patented technology will make it feasible to generate clean viable electricity at the dam. Lock + TM Hydro Friends Fund XII, part of Hydro Green Energy based in Westmont, Illinois has filed preliminary permit application with the Federal Energy Regulatory Commission to study the feasibility of its Hepburn Street Dam project. If such a permit is issued, it would give Hydro priority to file an application for a license to operate the facility.

The project would impact only 150 feet at the northern or Williamsport side of the 1,015-foot dam that is formally known as the Anthony J. Cimini Dam in memory of a late state representative. The project would include a 25-foot deep large frame module containing 10, 900-megawatt hydropower turbines. It would be installed either in the levee on the Williamsport side of the river or in the upper pool of the dam, the permit application states.

Engineering, legal and other expenses related to the feasibility study are estimated to cost $525,000, the FERC document states. The current timetable shows construction in 2018. When operational, the facility will generate an estimated 51,000 megawatts of electricity annually that will be sold to a utility or an industrial customer. A PPL substation is a short distance from the dam in Williamsport.

Fish ladder
The Hepburn Street Dam has a fish ladder located on the South Williamsport side of the dam. In 2014 the fish ladder was rebuilt—it was widened because sticks and debris were becoming stuck in the ladder, and more lanes were added so that more fish would be able to use the ladder. Originally, the dam did not have a fish ladder; it was added in the early to late 1990s as a result of pressure on local officials to add the ladder for American shad.

References

Dams on the Susquehanna River
Dams completed in 1986
Gravity dams
Dams in Pennsylvania
1986 establishments in Pennsylvania
Buildings and structures in Lycoming County, Pennsylvania
Dams with fish ladders